The Walton Institute formerly the Telecommunications Software & Systems Group (TSSG) is a large Irish information and communications technologies (ICT) research institute in Waterford Institute of Technology.  It is based in the WIT West Campus, having brought in the funding for the two research buildings located there: ArcLabs Research and Innovation Centre (opened 2005), combining the TSSG with incubation and innovation space, formally opened by the Taoiseach in October 2006 (note that this combined Enterprise Ireland and Higher Education Authority funding), and NetLabs (opened 2011, used Higher Education Authority funding), formally opened by Minister of Education in March 2014.

The TSSG was established in 1996 by Willie Donnelly and Eamonn de Leastar. They were joined later by Mícheál Ó Foghlú and Barry Downes to form the executive team.  Thus Willie, Eamonn, Mícheál and Barry are co-founders of the TSSG.  Initially the group was focused on applied research funded by a series of EU Framework Programmes for Research and Technological Development projects.  The first project was DIFFERENCE.  The TSSG has retained this emphasis on EU funding, engaging in large number of projects in FP5, FP6 and FP7, the most recent large EU project led by the TSSG is SOCIETIES. The group built on this foundation to address basic research, funded by Higher Education Authority PRTLI programme projects M-Zones and FutureComm (Serving Society), and by a series of Science Foundation Ireland projects including FAME.  In parallel, the TSSG strengthened its focus on industry, particularly through commercialisation activity funded by Enterprise Ireland (e.g. IMS-ARCS).  As well as licensing technology to existing companies the TSSG has been actively engaged in the creation or attraction of over 17 start-up companies (spin-in and spin-outs) from 2000-2017, such as FeedHenry and Zolk C creating over 100 additional jobs directly in the region.

The TSSG has grown in size since it was established employed over 100 staff and students from 2004 onwards, funded by an active portfolio of between 30 and 40 research projects at any one time.  In its history, it has brought in €65 million of funding from over 160 individual projects.

The TSSG is actively engaged in standards groups in general, and has been a member of the W3C and the Telemanagement Forum, and is helping to steer the Future Internet agenda in Europe as a partner and member of a number of European Technology Platforms (Net!Works, NEM, NESSI) and strategic groups of Industry collaborators including the Future Internet Assembly (FIA) and ETSI.

The TSSG ethos continues to be an attempt to straddle all of these types of activity, each with its own priorities, to ensure the continued relevance of its research and development activities.  This Innovation Model was formally documented in a submission to the Irish Innovation Task Force in 2009, but draws on its much longer history of innovation.

In 2010 Mícheál Ó Foghlú took a leave of absence from the TSSG to join the TSSG spinout FeedHenry Ltd. and in 2014 published his personal perspective on the history of the TSSG. In total TSSG has created 15 start-ups since its inception and 12 since 2006. The TSSG also provides a wide range of innovation services to start-ups and multinationals, particularly those based in Ireland, and as of 2014 completes around 40 or more direct industry innovation projects a year.

In 2011 the TSSG restructured into a series of Research Units (RUs) that each have active basic, applied and commercial activity. More narrowly focused units are called groups rather than units, usually driven by a single funding source rather than the full mix.
 Mobile Services
 3MT (Mobile, Messaging and Middleware) – Full lifecycle of integrated services, Inter-discipline service management research, cognitive mechanisms, federation, virtual infrastructure and cloud computing
 Data Mining and Social Computing
 Design and Usability
 ENL (Emerging Networks Laboratory)
These units collaborate on larger projects, and bring in funding to strategically grow each of these research areas.

In 2012, the TSSG restructured its management team and the TSSG is now led by Prof. Willie Donnelly as Director and Barry Downes as CEO and supported by a senior management team.

In March 2014, Ruairi Quinn, Minister for Education, officially opened NetLabs, as part of the Research and Innovation cluster of WIT's West Campus.

In September 2019 Dr. Sasitharan Balasubramaniam was appointed as Director of Research to join Kevin Doolin, Director of Innovation to drive the research centre towards investigating futuristic next-generation technologies, to verify their capabilities and applicability for today’s society, and to work in collaboration with industry to ensure their commercialisation.

Specialist Areas

There are 5 specialist research areas within TSSG, which are Agri-Tech, which TSSG is leading a number of research projects in this area. One example is the €17.5m “DEMETER” project that is looking at creating full interoperability of equipment, sensors and machinery across the agricultural supply chain. TSSG is also part of the Science Foundation Ireland (SFI) VistaMilk research centre that combines basic and applied research in Agri-Tech. Example research includes the development of bio-computing engineered cells that can be used for animal diagnostics, digital modelling of nutrient flows within the human body, and the integration of lightweight AI into novel wireless devices that can be used on the farm. An example of an end-to-end vision for this research is to realise the use of bio-computing modules in animals transmitting animal health information to DEMETER’s dedicated software platforms that can then be utilized by various third parties (farmers, vets, pharma companies, consumers).

The Brain Initiative is multidisciplinary and crosses between multiple Research Units. The decision to start this new initiative and research direction is due to the importance of this new research field globally, where we are witnessing large amount of investments both in Europe (EU FET Flagship “Human Brain Project”) and the US (Obama “BRAIN” initiative). While the field of Brain research has predominantly been driven by Neuroscience, ICT has started to play a role in developing new approaches for understanding the operations of neural systems, as well as diagnosing diseases. TSSG has traditionally been an ICT research centre that focuses on research in communication networks and services, and it is the intention of this initiative to bring theories from traditional “communication and networking” to understand the brain’s communication process. The latter is mainly focused on new solutions to help patients suffering from neurodegenerative diseases. The other motivation for the creation of the initiative is the linkages we are now starting to witness between the brain and machines.

The Future Health area consists of exploration into how Mobile, IOT, Mixed reality, Big Data and AI can transform the healthcare industry are at the forefront of future trends and research efforts in this space. Advancements in technologies are driving research areas and marketable products focused on remote patient care, precision medicine and genomics along with population health management and point-of -care diagnostics. The TSSG Future Health Specialist group tracks and guides research efforts across these varying strands.

The Intelligent Transport Systems area focuses on the research and innovation in delivering the Cooperative-ITS, which is also known as Vehicle-to-Everything (V2X) communication and has been regarded as the cornerstone for next-generation ITS solutions. Within this area, our research on ITS concentrate on software-defined radio, service and resource management, application for traffic efficiency and safety, and cybersecurity, which have covered most of the protocol stack of V2X from the physical layer to the application layer. The research work in these domains and our solid background in ICT provide us with a comprehensive understanding of ITS and drive us to deliver innovative ITS solutions.

In the Smart Energy area TSSG work on smart grid solutions for industry, particularly those that have a degree of flexibility in the timing of their energy use. This is done through modelling their usage profile and isolating the flexibility portion of their energy networks. This facilitates the optimisation of that load against the wholesale energy market and any available onsite generation. Industry can expect energy savings, more use of renewable technologies and reductions in their carbon footprint.

H2020

To date WIT has competitively secured over €16.6 million during the course of the H2020 funding programme, with €14.8 million competitively won by the Telecommunications Software & Systems Group (TSSG) research centre. Since the beginning of the H2020 programme in 2014, TSSG have secured funding for 28 ICT projects in the areas of healthcare, intelligent transport, agri-tech and smart energy all with the overarching goal of improving our society of the future as directed by the EU Commission. Of the 28 projects secured by TSSG, having a total project value of €168m, 12 of these were co-ordinated by TSSG. Of this total value, €14.8million goes directly to TSSG and the remainder is allocated to each partner on the project positioned throughout Europe.

References

External links 
 Official TSSG site
 WIT site
 HEA PRTLI Ireland
 Science Foundation Ireland
 Enterprise Ireland

Research institutes in the Republic of Ireland
Education in the Republic of Ireland
Science and technology in Ireland